Several Reasons Recordings is a record label / performance projects management based in Berlin, Germany, in collaboration with London, Italy and Cyprus. Founded in 2012, it is owned and managed by Alfeo Pier (Dubit), Christos Erotocritou and Max Vassiades (mynude).

Whilst mainly focused on vinyl & digital releases the label is also a platform for creativity with emphasis on audio / visual installations and performance arts as well as projects spanning from custom VST / software plugins to bespoke hardware controllers.

Label roster
/Artists
 Dubit
 Scalameriya
 SpunOff
 Mynude
 Deam
 Alhek

/Remixers
 Dadub
 Ness
 Eomac
 Myler
 Giorgio Gigli

See also
 List of record labels
 List of electronic music record labels

References

German record labels
Electronic music record labels
Techno record labels
Ambient music record labels